The 1994 Ballon d'Or, given to the best football player in Europe as judged by a panel of sports journalists from UEFA member countries, was awarded to Hristo Stoichkov on 20 December 1994.

Stoichkov was the first Bulgarian national to win the award. He was the third Barcelona player to win the trophy after Luis Suárez (1960), and Johan Cruyff (1973, 1974).

Rankings

Team of the Year 
Apparently there was also a European Team of the Year chosen at the Ballon d'Or presentation. The team reported by El País was as follows:

References

External links
 France Football Official Ballon d'Or page

1994
1994–95 in European football